Indonesia competed at the 1988 Summer Olympics in Seoul, South Korea.  The nation won its first ever Olympic medal. 29 competitors, 26 men and 3 women, took part in 32 events in 11 sports.

Medalists

Competitors
The following is the list of number of competitors in the Games.

Competitors 
The following is the list of number of competitors participating in the Games:

Archery 

In Indonesia's fourth Olympic archery competition, the women's team won the nation's first Olympic medal of any sport.  Their one-point lead over the Soviet Union put them in a tie with the United States for second place behind the dominant Korean team and guaranteeing the Indonesians a medal. A 72–67 shootout victory made it a silver.

Women's Individual Competition:
 Nurfitriyana Saiman – Semifinal (→ 9th place)
 Kusuma Wardhani – 1/8 final (→ 19th place)
 Lilies Handayani – Preliminary Round (→ 30th place)

Men's Individual Competition:
 Syafrudin Mawi – Preliminary Round (→ 48th place)

Women's Team Competition:
 Nurfitriyana Saiman, Kusuma Wardhani, and Lilies Handayani – Final (→ Silver medal)

Athletics 

 Key
 Note–Ranks given for track events are within the athlete's heat only
 Q = Qualified for the next round
 q = Qualified for the next round as a fastest loser or, in field events, by position without achieving the qualifying target
 NR = National record
 N/A = Round not applicable for the event
 Bye = Athlete not required to compete in round

Boxing

Fencing 

Two fencers, one man and one woman, represented Indonesia in 1988.

Men's foil
 Alkindi

Women's foil
 Silvia Koeswandi

Sailing 

Men

Shooting 

Women's Sporting Pistol 25 metres
Selvyana Adrian-Sofyan - 568 points, 35th place

Swimming

Table tennis 

Men's singles
 Tonny Maringgi - 6 of 8, Group B

Tennis

Weightlifting

Wrestling 

Men's freestyle 48 kg
 Suryadi Gunawan - Group stage

Men's freestyle 52 kg
 Surya Saputra - Group stage

References

External links 
Official Olympic Reports
International Olympic Committee results database

Nations at the 1988 Summer Olympics
1988
1988 in Indonesian sport